Angiola is an unincorporated community in Tulare County, California, United States. The community was named after Angela Bacigalupi, wife of a landowner there. Angiola had a post office from 1898 to 1927.

References

Unincorporated communities in Tulare County, California
Unincorporated communities in California